Monte Casale is a mountainous elevation on Sicily in Italy, reaching 910m above sea level, which (with the neighbouring Monte Lauro) formed part of the oldest volcanic formation of the Hyblaean Mountains. Their peaks form the boundary between the present-day provinces of Syracuse and Ragusa and the watershed between the Irminio and Anapo rivers. It is notable for its important archaeological remains, discovered by Paolo Orsi early in the 20th century and identified by him with the ancient Greek city of Casmene.

Casale